The Narada Falls Bridge is a reinforced concrete arch bridge in Mount Rainier National Park, spanning the Paradise River above Narada Falls. The bridge was built in 1927-1928 by contractor J.D. Tobin of Portland, Oregon, who built the Christine Falls Bridge at the same time. The arch spans . It was faced with rubble stonework and is an example of National Park Service Rustic design. The bridge is not open for public traffic, and leads to the Narada park utility area

The bridge was placed on the National Register of Historic Places on March 13, 1991. It is part of the Mount Rainier National Historic Landmark District, which encompasses the entire park and which recognizes the park's inventory of Park Service-designed rustic architecture.

References

External links
 
 Historic American Engineering Record (HAER)

Road bridges on the National Register of Historic Places in Washington (state)
Bridges completed in 1928
Bridges in Lewis County, Washington
Arch bridges in the United States
Rustic architecture in Washington (state)
Buildings and structures in Mount Rainier National Park
Historic American Engineering Record in Washington (state)
1928 establishments in Washington (state)
National Register of Historic Places in Mount Rainier National Park
Concrete bridges in the United States